Joseph R. Gannascoli (born February 15, 1959) is an American actor and chef. He is best known for his portrayal of Vito Spatafore on the HBO series The Sopranos.

Early life
Gannascoli was born and raised in Brooklyn, New York. In the 1980s, he attended St. John's University for two years, majoring in communications.

Career
Gannascoli received his "big break" in acting from Benicio del Toro, whom he met on the set on Money for Nothing. After appearing in Ed Wood, Del Toro later cast Gannascoli in his directorial debut, Submission. He also introduced him to Sheila Jaffe and Georgianne Walken, who did casting work for the HBO TV series The Sopranos.

Gannascoli appeared in films including Mickey Blue Eyes and television shows including Law and Order before appearing on The Sopranos as a pastry shop patron named "Gino" in the season one episode "The Legend of Tennessee Moltisanti". He later secured the role of Vito Spatafore, debuting in the season two episode "The Happy Wanderer". Along with Dan Grimaldi playing identical twins Patsy and Phillip "Philly Spoons" Parisi and Saundra Santiago playing identical twins Jeannie and Joannie Cusamano, it was one of the three times that the show used a single actor for separate roles. Prior to the start of Season 6, Gannascoli was promoted to series regular. Gannascoli brought the idea to the writers of making his character gay from a true story of the Gambino crime family, in a book called Murder Machine. 

Gannascoli later appeared in other films including Men in Black III. He stars in the 2015 movie An Act of War.

In 2019, he appeared on an episode of the cannabis-themed competition cooking show, Bong Appétit: Cook Off. He appeared with Vincent Pastore on Gordon Ramsay's 24 Hours to Hell and Back on January 21, 2020.

Gannascoli is set to star in the pilot episode of "Bring on the Dancing Horses" with Kate Bosworth.

Novel
In January 2006, Gannascoli published a crime novel called A Meal to Die For: A Culinary Novel of Crime.

Culinary Career

Prior to acting, Gannascoli was part-owner of a New York restaurant. However, in 1995, a $60,000 gambling debt forced him to sell his share and leave the restauranteur business. 
 
Since around 2017, Gannascoli has offered catering services for small parties, doing most of the cooking himself.

Filmography

References

External links

Joe Gannascoli In-Depth Profile at AventuraUSA.com
Joe Gannascoli Interview on World Talk LIVE!

1959 births
20th-century American male actors
21st-century American male actors
American male film actors
American male television actors
Male actors from New York City
People from Brooklyn
American people of Italian descent
Living people
Participants in American reality television series